Fresh Ideas TV was a digital advertorial datacasting channel owned by the Seven Network. The channel launched on 22 November 2013 and broadcast infomercials and home shopping content on channel 78.

The channel was available to Seven's metropolitan markets of Sydney, Melbourne, Brisbane, Adelaide and Perth as well as their regional Queensland station. Fresh Ideas TV was closed on 1 December 2014. Channel 78 was later re-purposed for Racing.com, which began broadcasting on 26 June 2015.

References

Seven Network
English-language television stations in Australia
Television channels and stations established in 2013
Television channels and stations disestablished in 2014
Home shopping television stations in Australia
2013 establishments in Australia
2014 disestablishments in Australia
Defunct television channels in Australia